FXU may refer to:

 FilmXtra Uncut, a film review television show
 Fox (UK and Ireland), a European television network
 St. Francis Xavier University in Nova Scotia, Canada
 Fixed-point unit, part of the POWER1 CPU
 FXU, the student union of Falmouth University